Italian churches consecrated to Santa Maria Assunta (The Assumption of Mary) include:
Santa Maria Assunta, Acerra cathedral 
Santa Maria Assunta, Acqui Terme Cathedral 
Santa Maria Assunta, Altamura, Province of Bari, Puglia
Santa Maria Assunta, Cremona cathedral 
Santa Maria Assunta, Esine, in Val Camonica
Santa Maria Assunta, Gaeta cathedral 
Santa Maria Assunta, Guardialfiera. Province of Campobasso, Molise
Maria Santissima Assunta, Gravina di Puglia co-cathedral, Province of Bari
Santa Maria Assunta di La Verna La Verna basilica-sanctuary of in the Tuscan Apennines
Naples Cathedral
Orvieto Cathedral
Ostuni Cathedral
Piacenza Cathedral	(Santa Giustina e Santa Maria Assunta)
Santa Maria Assunta, Pisa cathedral, Tuscany
Santa Maria Assunta, Randazzo basilica church, Sicily
Santa Maria Assunta, Siena cathedral, Tuscany
Santa Maria Assunta, Spoleto cathedral
Santa Maria Assunta, Torcello basilica church, island near Venice, Veneto
Santa Maria dei Carmini, formerly known as Santa Maria Assunta, Venice, Veneto

See also
 Church of Santa Maria Assunta (disambiguation)
 Church of Nuestra Señora de la Asunción (disambiguation)

Santa Maria Assunta